Coal Creek is a stream in eastern Iron County, Utah, United States.

Description
Coal Creek passes through Cedar City on its way to Cedar Valley.

See also

 List of rivers in Utah

References

External links

Rivers of Utah
Rivers of Iron County, Utah